The Ali Daei Stadium is a 20,000 seater stadium in Ardabil, Iran. The seated capacity may in due course be increased to 30,000. The stadium is part of a much larger sports complex that extends over 40,000 square meters. The stadium's car park has a capacity of 7,000. It's named in honour of Ali Daei, former captain and manager of Iran national football team and FC Bayern Munich , Hertha BSC , Arminia Bielefeld , Al Sadd SC , Al Shabab FC , Saipa F.C. and Saba Battery F C.

It was opened on 23 May 2008 in memory of the Liberation of Khorramshahr, a friendly match was played between the Iran national football team and Saipa F.C. in front of 20,000 fans who were admitted for free in a 6–0 win for Team Melli. The stadium was designed by architect Mohammad Ali Rooni.

Notes

Buildings and structures in Ardabil
Sports venues completed in 2008
Football venues in Iran
Sport in Ardabil Province